George Michael Riley (born October 6, 1956) is a former American professional baseball pitcher.

Career
He graduated from South Philadelphia High School in Philadelphia in 1974 and was drafted by the Cubs in the fourth round of the 1974 amateur draft. His only major league victory came as a member of the Giants in 1984.

References

External links

1956 births
Living people
American expatriate baseball players in Canada
Appleton Foxes players
Baseball players from Philadelphia
Chicago Cubs players
Gulf Coast Cubs players
Indianapolis Indians players
Key West Cubs players
Maine Guides players
Major League Baseball pitchers
Midland Cubs players
Montreal Expos players
Phoenix Giants players
Pompano Beach Cubs players
Portland Beavers players
Reading Phillies players
San Francisco Giants players
Wichita Aeros players